John Raymond Kavanagh (born 18 January 1977) is an Irish martial arts coach, Brazilian jiu-jitsu practitioner and former professional mixed martial artist. His students include fighters such as Conor McGregor, Makwan Amirkhani, and Gunnar Nelson.

Background
He is the founder and head coach of Irish MMA gym Straight Blast Gym Ireland in Inchicore. He is the current president of the Irish Mixed Martial Arts Association. Kavanagh was inspired to take up mixed martial arts after watching footage of the UFC tournament in 1993. A pioneer of MMA in Ireland, he competed in some of the earliest local circuit MMA events in Ireland and the UK and is the first Irish man to receive a black belt in Brazilian jiu-jitsu. Kavanagh was welcomed into the Straight Blast Gym International association of gyms in 2001 by SBGi founder Matt Thornton.

Today, Kavanagh is known as one of the best MMA coaches in the world, being nominated for the World MMA Awards "Coach of the Year" in 2016, and winning it in 2017.

Kavanagh is also the promoter of a mixed martial arts organization Euro Fight Night which held their inaugural event in October 2019.

John Kavanagh is the current president of the Irish Amateur MMA Organisation, IMMMA.

Awards and achievements
 World MMA Awards
 2017 The Shawn Tompkins Coach of the Year

Mixed martial arts record

|-
|Win
|align=center|3–3
|Robbie Oliver
|Submission (armbar)
|UZI 2: Combat Evolution
|8 March 2003
|align=center|1
|align=center|2:26
|Milton Keynes, England, United Kingdom
|
|-
|Loss
|align=center|2–3
|Danny Batten
|Submission (keylock)
|UZI 1: Cage Combat Evolution
|30 November 2002
|align=center|2
|align=center|N/A
|Milton Keynes, England, United Kingdom
|
|-
|Loss
|align=center|2–2
|Leigh Remedios
|Decision (unanimous)
|UC 1: Ultimate Combat 1
|10 March 2002
|align=center|3
|align=center|5:00
|Wiltshire, England, United Kingdom
|
|-
|Win
|align=center|2–1
|Tamel Hasar
|Submission (rear naked choke)
|Cage Wars 1
|23 February 2002
|align=center|1
|align=center|N/A
|Portsmouth, England, United Kingdom
|
|-
|Loss
|align=center|1–1
|Bobby Karagiannidis
|KO (punches)
|Pride and Honor: Pride and Honor
|24 November 2001
|align=center|1
|align=center|N/A
|South Africa
|
|-
|Win
|align=center|1–0
|Leighton Hill
|Submission (triangle choke)
|Grapple & Strike 1
|29 May 2000
|align=center|1
|align=center|0:55
|Worcester, England, United Kingdom
|
|}

Instructor lineage 

Kanō Jigorō → Tomita Tsunejirō → Mitsuyo "Count Koma" Maeda → Hélio Gracie → Rolls Gracie & Carlos "Carlinhos" Gracie Jr → Rigan Machado → Chris Haueter → Matt Thornton → John Kavanagh

Further reading
 Kavanagh, John (2016). Win or Learn: MMA, Conor McGregor and Me: A Trainer's Journey. Penguin Random House UK
 Slack, Jack (2017). Notorious: The Life and Fights of Conor Mcgregor. John Blake Publishing Ltd

References

1977 births
21st-century Irish people
Living people
Irish male karateka
Irish male mixed martial artists
Lightweight mixed martial artists
Irish practitioners of Brazilian jiu-jitsu
People awarded a black belt in Brazilian jiu-jitsu
Sportspeople from Dublin (city)
Mixed martial artists utilizing American Kenpo
Mixed martial artists utilizing Brazilian jiu-jitsu